Makwetu is a surname. Notable people with the surname include:

Clarence Makwetu (1928–2016), South African anti-apartheid activist, politician, and leader of the Pan Africanist Congress of Azania
Thembekile Kimi Makwetu (died 2020), Auditor-General of South Africa

Xhosa-language surnames